Trelleora is a genus of crickets in the tribe Podoscirtini.  Species have been recorded in: India, southern China and Indochina.

Species 
The Orthoptera Species File includes the following species:
 Trelleora consimilis Gorochov, 2003
 Trelleora fumosa Gorochov, 1988
 Trelleora gravelyi (Chopard, 1928)
 Trelleora kryszhanovskiji Gorochov, 1988 - type species
 Trelleora sonlensis Gorochov, 1988
 Trelleora suthepa Ingrisch, 1997

References

External links
 

Ensifera genera
crickets
Orthoptera of Indo-China